The 2023 North Carolina Central Eagles football team will represent North Carolina Central University as a member of the Mid-Eastern Athletic Conference (MEAC) during the 2023 NCAA Division I FCS football season. The Eagles are led by fourth-year head coach Trei Oliver and play home games at O'Kelly–Riddick Stadium in Durham, North Carolina

Previous season

The Eagles finished the 2022 season with a record of 10–2, 4-1 MEAC play to finish in first in the MEAC. They won their fourth black college football national championship in school history by defeating then-undefeated Jackson State in the Celebration Bowl, 41–34.

Schedule

References

North Carolina Central
North Carolina Central Eagles football seasons
North Carolina Central Eagles football